Carlos Wanderley (born 16 December 1966) is a Brazilian sailor. He competed in the men's 470 event at the 1988 Summer Olympics.

References

External links
 

1966 births
Living people
Brazilian male sailors (sport)
Olympic sailors of Brazil
Sailors at the 1988 Summer Olympics – 470
Sportspeople from Rio de Janeiro (city)